University of Antananarivo is the primary public university of Madagascar, located in the capital Antananarivo.

History 
The university traces its founding to 16 December 1955 and the formation of the Institute for Advanced Studies in Antananarivo. It established itself as the main center for higher education in the country, and was renamed the University of Madagascar in 1961. It later opened five more branches in Antsiranana, Fianarantsoa, Toamasina, Toliara, and Mahajanga.

Robert Mallet taught in Madagascar from 1959 to 1964, where he founded the Faculty of Letters at the University of Antananarivo, of which he was the first Dean.

The University of Antananarivo runs the Museum of Arts and Archaeology. The Institute of Higher Education of Soavinandriana Itasy and the Institute of Higher Education of Antsirabe Vakinankaratra are its two regional branches.

With the Ministère de l’Enseignement Supérieur et de la Recherche Scientifique (Ministry of Higher Education), staff of the university oversee MadaRevues, a website compilation of scientific journals published in Madagascar. PDF articles are viewable for free.

Sports 
The university's sports facilities were used for the official 2011 African Basketball Championship.

Notable people 

 Chantal Radimilahy, Madagascar's first woman archaeologist and director of the Museum of Arts and Archaeology.

See also

 List of universities in Madagascar

References

External links
 Antananarivo University

 
Universities in Madagascar
Educational institutions established in 1955
1955 establishments in Madagascar